Clayton Fritsch (born December 29, 1998) is an American pole vaulter. In 2019, he won the bronze medal in the men's pole vault event at the 2019 Pan American Games held in Lima, Peru.

In that same year, he won the bronze medal in the men's pole vault event at the 2019 NCAA Division I Outdoor Track and Field Championships. He also won the gold medal in the men's pole vault event at the 2019 NACAC U18 and U23 Championships in Athletics held in Queretaro, Mexico.

References

External links 
 

Living people
1998 births
Place of birth missing (living people)
American male pole vaulters
Athletes (track and field) at the 2019 Pan American Games
Pan American Games bronze medalists for the United States
Pan American Games medalists in athletics (track and field)
Pan American Games track and field athletes for the United States
Medalists at the 2019 Pan American Games
Sam Houston Bearkats athletes
People from Sealy, Texas
Track and field athletes from Texas